More Women of Wonder: Science Fiction Novelettes by Women About Women is an anthology of five novelettes and two short stories edited by Pamela Sargent. It was published in 1976. The collection reprints work by female science fiction authors originally published from 1935 to 1974, arranged in chronological order.

More Women of Wonder was the second anthology in a series of three volumes published in the 1970s, preceded by Women of Wonder (1975), and followed by The New Women of Wonder (1978). These volumes are considered one of the first science fiction collections to focus on women in science fiction both as authors and as varied and complex characters. Sargent's introductions to the anthologies, in particular, are seen to have offered "comprehensive and informed analyses of the images and role of women in sf."

Contents 

 "Introduction: More Women of Wonder" - Pamela Sargent
 "Jirel Meets Magic"  (1935) - C. L. Moore
 "The Lake of the Gone Forever"  (1949) - Leigh Brackett
 "The Second Inquisition" (1970) - Joanna Russ
 "The Power of Time" (1971) - Josephine Saxton
 "The Funeral" (1972) - Kate Wilhelm
 "Tin Soldier" (1974) - Joan D. Vinge
 "The Day Before the Revolution" (1974) - Ursula K. Le Guin
Further Reading (More Women of Wonder) - Pamela Sargent 
About the Authors (More Women of Wonder) - Pamela Sargent

Reception 
A contemporary reviewer judged the volume "intelligent, [and] thought-provoking," noting that it would "appeal to any and all science fiction fans and especially to readers who are tired of women portrayed as victims of BEMs (bug eyed monsters)."

References

Further reading 
James Nicoll. "More SF about women, by women." James Nicoll Reviews. 28 February 2015.

External links 
 More Women of Wonder title listing at the Internet Speculative Fiction Database
 More Women of Wonder at the Internet Archive.

1976 anthologies
Science fiction anthologies
Women science fiction and fantasy writers
Literature by women